Nenad Gračan (born 23 January 1962) is a Croatian football manager and former player who played as a midfielder. He is the coach of the Croatia women's national football team.

Club career
Born in Rijeka, SFR Yugoslavia, Gračan started playing professionally for hometown's NK Orijent and, soon thereafter, HNK Rijeka, amassing nearly 150 official appearances. He then moved to another club in his native Croatia, HNK Hajduk Split. During his first match at Hajduk Gračan was injured while playing against his former club by Mladen Mladenović who nearly broke Gračan's leg. Because of this injury he appeared intermittently for Hajduk over the course of four full seasons.

Late into 1989, Gračan signed with La Liga club Real Oviedo. Joined by compatriots Janko Janković and Nikola Jerkan in his second season, he helped the Asturians finish sixth and qualify for the UEFA Cup by contributing with 26 matches, and eventually appeared in more than 100 games overall.

Aged almost 31, Gračan left Oviedo and returned to his country, now independent. After two years of inactivity he played a handful of games with first professional club Rijeka, but retired shortly after. In the following decade, he took up coaching, starting with his last team as a player, but he rarely settled.

International career
Gračan made his debut for Yugoslavia in a March 1984 friendly match against Hungary and earned a total of 10 caps, scoring 2 goals. He never attended any major international tournament. In 1984, the then 21-year-old helped the Olympic squad win the bronze medal in Los Angeles, featuring in all games but one and scoring in the quarterfinals against West Germany (5–2). His final international was a May 1986 friendly away against Belgium.

International appearances

International goals

Managerial career
In June 2001, he was named manager of Hajduk Split.
Gračan was dismissed as manager of Pula in May 2007
 and he took charge of Rijeka for a third time in November 2009.

Personal life
Gračan married former miss Croatia Daniela Mihalic in 1999. The couple have three daughters.

Career statistics

As a player

</ref>

Managerial statistics

Club

National team

 *Dates of first and last games under Gračan; not dates of official appointments

Honours

Player
Hajduk Split
Yugoslav Cup: 1987

Yugoslavia
Summer Olympics bronze medal: 1984

Individual
SN Yellow Shirt award: 1985-86
NK Rijeka all time XI by Novi list

References

External links

National team data 

1962 births
Living people
Footballers from Rijeka
Association football midfielders
Yugoslav footballers
Yugoslavia international footballers
Olympic footballers of Yugoslavia
Footballers at the 1984 Summer Olympics
Olympic bronze medalists for Yugoslavia
Olympic medalists in football
Medalists at the 1984 Summer Olympics
Croatian footballers
HNK Orijent players
HNK Rijeka players
HNK Hajduk Split players
Real Oviedo players
Yugoslav First League players
La Liga players
Croatian Football League players
Yugoslav expatriate footballers
Croatian expatriate footballers
Expatriate footballers in Spain
Yugoslav expatriate sportspeople in Spain
Croatian expatriate sportspeople in Spain
Croatian football managers
HNK Rijeka managers
HNK Hajduk Split managers
FC Koper managers
NK Osijek managers
NK Kamen Ingrad managers
GNK Dinamo Zagreb managers
NK Istra 1961 managers
NK Croatia Sesvete managers
Croatia national under-21 football team managers
Croatian expatriate football managers
Expatriate football managers in Slovenia
Croatian expatriate sportspeople in Slovenia